Curtis Macdonald (also known as Curtis Robert Macdonald) is a composer and saxophonist. He moved to New York City in 2003 and lives in Brooklyn. He is Faculty at The New School for Jazz.

Macdonald has a background in sound design and draws inspiration from this in his work. In 2015 he won a Peabody Award for his work on the show Meet The Composer at WQXR and was the Technical Director of The Open Ears Project from WNYC Studios that was named one of The Best 50 Podcasts of 2019 from the Atlantic Magazine that was also Nominated for Best Music Podcast and Honored for Best Series in the 24th Annual Webby Awards.

To date he has composed original scores for Alvin Ailey American Dance Theater, Aszure Barton, Kate Weare Company and Hubbard Street Dance Chicago among others.

Macdonald's work caught the attention of Pulitzer prize winner Henry Threadgill and in 2016 Macdonald was a soloist on Old Locks and Irregular Verbs, an album in tribute to Lawrence D. "Butch" Morris

In 2013, Macdonald authored Introducing Extended Saxophone Techniques published by Mel Bay.

Albums
 Community Immunity (2011)
 Twice Through The Wall (2013)
 Scotobiology (2016)

References

External links
 

Peabody Award winners
The New School faculty
Living people
1985 births